This is a partial list of molecules that contain 2 carbon atoms.

See also
 Carbon number
 List of compounds with carbon number 1
 List of compounds with carbon number 3

C02